The Garden City Skyway is a major high-level bridge located in St. Catharines and Niagara-on-the-Lake, Ontario, Canada, that allows the Queen Elizabeth Way (QEW) to cross the Welland Canal without the interruption of a lift bridge. It is the tallest and largest single structure along the entire QEW; the Burlington Bay James N. Allan Skyway, which is also part of the QEW, is actually two separate and smaller four-lane bridges. Among all the bridges spanning the present Welland Canal, the Skyway is numbered Bridge 4A (the Homer Lift Bridge is Bridge 4).

When the Garden City Skyway be closed due to a traffic accident or weather conditions, traffic is diverted along frontage roads (Dieppe Road, Dunkirk Road, Glendale Avenue, Queenston Road, Taylor Road and York Road) to cross the canal at the Homer Lift Bridge, re-connecting to the QEW on the opposite side.

History 

Construction began in January 1960, with the main span crossing the Welland Canal hoisted into place in July of that same year.  The bridge was open to traffic on October 18, 1963.  During construction, the bridge was referred to as the Homer Skyway, taking its name from the lift bridge that the new skyway was to replace.  Upon dedication, the bridge was officially named the Garden City Skyway, using the nickname of St. Catharines, "Canada's Garden City." Tolls were charged on the bridge until 1973.

The construction work included an Ontario "tall-wall" concrete median barrier, new bridge parapets, and the installation of shaded high-pressure sodium lights using the existing truss poles.

In 2015, the high-pressure sodium lights on the bridge were replaced with bright white LED lights on the existing truss poles. The Ontario Ministry of Transportation (MTO) is actively pursuing studies with the goal of twinning the Skyway. The second bridge would be constructed north of the existing Skyway for Toronto-bound traffic, while the existing bridge would be used by vehicles heading toward Niagara.

See also
 
 
 
 Burlington Bay James N. Allan Skyway
 Burgoyne Bridge
 Queen Elizabeth Way
 Welland Canal
 List of bridges in Canada
 List of longest bridges

References

Road bridges in Ontario
Transport in St. Catharines
Buildings and structures in St. Catharines
Bridges completed in 1963
Former toll bridges in Canada